Kalyanaraman is a 2002 Indian Malayalam-language romantic comedy film directed by Shafi and written by Benny P. Nayarambalam, starring Dileep, Navya Nair and Kunchacko Boban. The plot follows Ramankutty and family who runs a catering service and the events that follows after they take the work of Ambattu Thampi's daughter's wedding. The music was composed by Berny-Ignatius. The film was a blockbuster and developed a cult fan following, especially the character Ponjikkara played by Innocent. The film was remade in Telugu as Kalyana Ramudu (2003).

Plot
Thekkedathu Ramankutty is an event organizer. He meets Gauri while doing the preparations for the wedding of her sister Radhika, both daughters of a family friend Ambattu Madhavan Thampi. However, Radhika's fiancée does not turn up for the wedding and Radhika passes out upon learning the news. Ramankutty suggests that his brother Dr. Sivadas marry Radhika and it takes place very gracefully. In a hilarious turn of events, Ramankutty and Gauri realize their love for each other which also rejoices their families, and they start arrangements for their wedding. But on the day of their engagement, Radhika dies in a kitchen fire accident.

After a long time from Radhika's demise, the family finally fixes Ramankutty's and Gauri's wedding. On the eve of the wedding, Gauri gets an electric shock. Deeply disturbed by this, Thampi visits an astrologer Meppattu Thirumeni to see the horoscope match, where he tells them that women married into the Thekkedathu family are fated to die young. He referred to the family's history. Ramankutty's grandmother died from her first pregnancy. Ramankutty's mother died shortly after giving birth to him. Ramankutty's eldest brother Achuthankutty's wife died one month after their wedding, due to a snake bite. And now Thampi's daughter has also died as she was married into Thekkedathu. Thampi, scared for his only remaining daughter's life, requests Ramankutty to back out of the marriage without the knowledge of Gauri.

Saddened and yet wanting to do the right thing, Ramankutty calls off the wedding on the pretense of not being comfortable with Gauri's close relations with her cousin Unni. Devastated by this allegation, Gauri backs out of the marriage, only to find the truth later. She runs out in search of Ramankutty, but gets into a road accident on the way. She is rushed to the hospital and while still battling for life, she wishes that Ramankutty tie the wedding knot before her surgery. Ramankutty ties the knot, fearing the worst. Miraculously, Gauri survives the surgery.

The story is unwound in a flashback by an aged Ramankutty who bids farewell to his spellbound teenage audience at a temple in a beautiful location. Towards the end he joins his wife Gauri in lighting the lamp.

Cast

Box office
The film was commercial success.

Soundtrack

References

External links
 
 Kalyanaraman at Oneindia

2000s Malayalam-language films
Films scored by Berny–Ignatius
2002 romantic comedy films
2002 films
Malayalam films remade in other languages
Films shot in Kochi
Films directed by Shafi
Indian romantic comedy films